is a town located in Iburi Subprefecture, Hokkaido, Japan. In March 2017, the town had an estimated population of 4,659, and a density of 12 persons per km2. The total area is 404.56 km2. The annual town festival is in mid-July, and is called "Inaka Matsuri" or "Country Festival". It is a two-day affair that starts in the main section of town with a parade featuring the Atsuma Dance and continuing the next day with performances at the Atsuma Dam.

There is a surfing beach nearby where the annual "Hama Matsuri" or "Beach Festival" in early-August.

Geography 
Atsuma has several rivers of which the most prominent is the Atsuma River. It is dammed in the northern area of town and continues down through the center of town and empties into the ocean near the ferry terminal and the Tomato-Atsuma Power Station.

Neighbouring municipalities 

 Tomakomai
 Yūbari
 Abira
 Mukawa
 Yuni

Climate

History
In the middle of the 12th century, Northern Fujiwara supposedly had its trading post in Atsuma.

On 6 September 2018, Atsuma was the town hardest hit by the 2018 Hokkaido Eastern Iburi earthquake. It caused landslides that killed several of the town's residents when their homes were buried. A revitalization effort organized by the town since 2018 has attracted new residents, leading to an increase of the town's population.

Education 
Atsuma currently has a high school, called the Hokkaido Atsuma High School (北海道厚真高等学校, Hokkaidō Atsuma Kōtōgakkō) The town also has two junior high schools and two elementary schools.

Transportation

Railway 

 JR Hokkaido
 Hidaka Main Line: Hama-Atsuma

Highways 

 Hidaka Expressway

Seaport
 Tomakomai East Port Shubun Ferry terminal (A Shin Nihonkai Ferry operates two ferries daily)

References

External links

Official Website 

Towns in Hokkaido